State elections were held in the Free State of Prussia on 20 May 1928 to elect all 450 members of the Landtag of Prussia. The governing coalition of the Social Democratic Party, Centre Party, and German Democratic Party retained its majority. The SPD recorded its best result since 1919 while the opposition German National People's Party suffered significant losses. The Centre Party, German People's Party, and DDP took modest losses; the Communist Party and Wirtschaftspartei made modest gains.

Results

Results by constituency

See also
 Elections in the Free State of Prussia
 Weimar Republic

Notes

References

External Links

1928 elections in Germany
1928
May 1928 events